Ronny Keller (born 6 October 1979) is a Swiss former ice hockey defenceman. Between 1997 and 2013, Keller played 14 seasons in the Swiss National League A (ZSC Lions, Kloten Flyers, Lausanne HC and Rapperswil-Jona Lakers) and National League B (Grasshopper Club Zürich, EHC Basel, Lausanne HC, HC Thurgau, HC Sierre-Anniviers and EHC Olten).

On March 5, 2013, Keller (who played for EHC Olten at the time) was checked from behind and into the boards by SC Langenthal forward Stefan Schnyder. He suffered significant damage to his fourth thoracic vertebra and was operated on the following day. On March 7 doctors announced that Keller's spinal cord injury would leave him a permanent paraplegic. The Swiss league opened a disciplinary investigation on the incident while SC Langenthal officials announced that Schnyder would sit out the remainder of the season.

References

External links

1979 births
Living people
Swiss ice hockey defencemen
ZSC Lions players
EHC Kloten players
SC Rapperswil-Jona Lakers players
EHC Basel players
EHC Olten players